is a member of the Japanese idol girl group SKE48. She is a member of SKE48's Team KII.

Biography 
Miyamae passed SKE48's 5th generation auditions in October 2011. Her debut was on November 26, 2011. On April 13, 2013, she was promoted to Team S during SKE48's shuffle. She started activities as a Team S member in July 2013.

In February 2014, during the AKB48 Group Shuffle, it was announced she would be transferred to Team KII.

Her future dream is to be a model.

Discography

SKE48 singles

AKB48 singles

Appearances

Stage units
SKE48 Kenkyuusei Stage 
 ""
SKE48 Kenkyuusei Stage 
 ""
 ""
 ""
SKE48 Team S 4th Stage "RESET"
 
SKE48 Team KII 3rd Stage  (Revival)

External links
 SKE48 Official Profile
 Official Blog

References

2000 births
Living people
Japanese idols
Japanese women pop singers
Musicians from Aichi Prefecture
SKE48 members
21st-century Japanese singers
21st-century Japanese women singers